David Samuel Anthony Lord,  (18 October 1913 – 19 September 1944) was a recipient of the Victoria Cross, the highest award for gallantry in the face of the enemy that can be awarded to British and Commonwealth forces. A transport pilot in the Royal Air Force, Lord received the award posthumously for his actions during the Battle of Arnhem while flying resupply missions in support of British paratroops.

Early life
David Lord was born on 18 October 1913 in Cork, Ireland, one of three sons of Samuel (a warrant officer in the Royal Welsh Fusiliers) and Mary Lord (née Miller). One of Lord's brothers died in infancy.

After the First World War the family were posted to British India and Lord attended Lucknow Convent School. On his father's retirement from the Army the family moved to Wrexham and then David was a pupil at St Mary's College, Aberystwyth, and then the University of Wales. Later, he attended the English College, Valladolid, Spain, to study for the priesthood. Deciding that it was not the career for him, he returned to Wrexham, before moving to London in the mid-1930s to work as a freelance writer.

Second World War
Lord enlisted in the Royal Air Force on 6 August 1936. After reaching the rank of corporal in August 1938, he applied to undertake pilot training, which he began in October 1938. Successfully gaining his pilot's wings, he became a sergeant pilot in April 1939, and was posted to No. 31 Squadron RAF, based in Lahore, India. He later flew the Vickers Valentia biplane transport. In 1941, No. 31 Squadron was the first unit to receive the Douglas DC-2 which was followed by both the Douglas DC-3 and Dakota transports. That year he was promoted to flight sergeant and then warrant officer. He flew in North Africa, supporting troops in Libya and Egypt for four months, before being posted back to India. Commissioned as a pilot officer in May 1942, he flew supply missions over Burma, for which he was mentioned in despatches.

Lord was awarded the Distinguished Flying Cross in July 1943, receiving the award at Buckingham Palace, and was promoted to flight lieutenant shortly afterwards. By January 1944, he had joined No. 271 Squadron (based at RAF Down Ampney, Gloucestershire) and began training as part of preparations for the invasion of Europe. On D-Day, Lord carried paratroopers into France and his aircraft was hit by flak, returning to base without flaps.

Battle of Arnhem
The Battle of Arnhem was part of Operation Market Garden, an attempt to secure a string of bridges through the Netherlands. At Arnhem, the British 1st Airborne Division and Polish 1st Independent Parachute Brigade were tasked with securing bridges across the Lower Rhine, the final objectives of the operation.  However, the airborne forces that dropped on 17 September were not aware that the 9th SS and 10th SS Panzer divisions were also near Arnhem for rest and refit. Their presence added a substantial number of Panzergrenadiers, tanks and self-propelled guns to the German defences and the Allies suffered heavily in the ensuing battle.  Only a small force managed to hold one end of the Arnhem road bridge before being overrun on 21 September. The rest of the division became trapped in a small pocket west of the bridge and had to be evacuated on 25 September. The Allies failed to cross the Rhine, which remained under German control until Allied offensives in March 1945.

Resupply flights

Lord was 30 years old, and a flight lieutenant serving with No. 271 Squadron, Royal Air Force during the Second World War when he was awarded the Victoria Cross. On 19 September 1944, during the Battle of Arnhem in the Netherlands, the British 1st Airborne Division was in desperate need of supplies. Lord's Douglas Dakota III "KG374" encountered intense enemy anti-aircraft fire and was twice hit, with one engine burning. Lord managed to drop his supplies, but at the end of the run found that there were two containers remaining. Although he knew that one of his wings might collapse at any moment, he nevertheless made a second run to drop the last supplies, then ordered his crew to bail out. A few seconds later, the Dakota crashed in flames with its pilot and six crew members.

Only the navigator, Flying Officer Harold King, survived, becoming a prisoner of war. It was only on his release in mid-1945, as well as the release of several paratroops from the 10th Parachute Battalion, that the story of Lord's action became known. Lord was awarded a posthumous Victoria Cross.

Victoria Cross citation

The full citation for Lord's VC appeared in a supplement to The London Gazette on 9 November 1945, reading:

Legacy

After Arnhem was liberated in April 1945, Grave Registration Units of the British 2nd Army moved into the area and began to locate the Allied dead. Lord was buried alongside his crew in the Arnhem Oosterbeek War Cemetery. There are many plaques in memory of him, including one at Wrexham Cathedral in Wales.

Several aircraft have carried tributes to Lord.  Between 1993 and 1998, the RAF Battle of Britain Memorial Flight's Dakota, serial "ZA947", was painted in the colours of Lord's aircraft during the Arnhem battle, and bore the same code letters: YS-DM. Between 1973 and 2005, the Dakota displayed at RAF Museum Cosford was similarly painted and coded to represent Lord's aircraft. From 1966 until its disbandment in 2005, No. 10 Squadron RAF was equipped with Vickers VC-10s, each of which was named after a Royal Air Force or Royal Flying Corps VC recipient.  Aircraft serial number 'XR810' was named David Lord VC.

Lord's Victoria Cross was presented to his parents at Buckingham Palace in December 1945. In 1997, Lord's VC, along with his other decorations and medals, were sold at auction by Spinks to Lord Ashcroft. As of 2014, the medal group was on display at the Imperial War Museum.

See also
Four other men were awarded the Victoria Cross at Arnhem:
Major Robert Henry Cain, 2nd Battalion, South Staffordshire Regiment.
Lance-Sergeant John Daniel Baskeyfield, 2nd Battalion, South Staffordshire Regiment.
Lieutenant John Hollington Grayburn, 2nd Battalion, Parachute Regiment.
Captain Lionel Ernest Queripel, 10th Battalion, Parachute Regiment.

References

Bibliography

External links
 The Arnhem Roll of Honour Database: David Samuel Anthony Lord

1913 births
1944 deaths
Irish aviators
Royal Air Force officers
Recipients of the Distinguished Flying Cross (United Kingdom)
Royal Air Force recipients of the Victoria Cross
British World War II pilots
Royal Air Force personnel killed in World War II
People from Cork (city)
Irish World War II recipients of the Victoria Cross
Aviators killed by being shot down
Victims of aviation accidents or incidents in 1944
Victims of aviation accidents or incidents in the Netherlands
Burials at Arnhem Oosterbeek War Cemetery